The 3rd Mediterranean Grand Prix was a motor race, run to Formula One rules, held on 16 August 1964 at the Autodromo di Pergusa, Sicily. The race was run over 60 laps of the circuit, and was won by Swiss driver Jo Siffert in a Brabham BT11.

British driver Mike Hailwood was involved in an accident during the race, in which his Lotus 25 ended up in Pergusa Lake.

Results

References

Mediterranean Grand Prix
Mediterranean Grand Prix
1964 in Italian motorsport